Paul Roland Gogo (born April 24, 1965), known as Gogo, is a Canadian rock-and-roll keyboard player, and multi-instrumentalist, best known for being the keyboardist of the Canadian rock band Trooper. His career has also included stints with rock vocalist Paul Laine.

He is also the author of Frank Ney:  A Canadian Legend, a biography about British Columbia legislator, and longtime Nanaimo mayor Frank Ney.

In 2004, Gogo played a major role in the creation of Joyride!, the debut album of his psychedelic rock group, The Super Groovy Band. The album has received positive acclaim from reviewers around the world.

He was featured in the 2008 documentary film, Mellodrama: The Mellotron Movie. Gogo has an extensive collection of vintage electronic musical instruments  which were on display in 2005 at the Royal British Columbia Museum in Victoria, British Columbia. Musical instruments collection included a rare early rev Sequential Circuits Prophet V synthesizer which he donated to the National Music Centre in Calgary for perpetuity

As part of the Vancouver 2010 Winter Olympics festivities, Gogo was featured when Trooper performed on February 21, 2010. Coverage of the event was broadcast in Canada and around the world on networks such as CTV and MuchMusic.

During the Winter of 2013, he gained international attention having had a stolen heirloom Framus banjo returned to him by the unusual tactic of offering friendship as a reward.

He ran in an unsuccessful bid for Nanaimo City Council in 2014 suggesting partnerships on Civic projects and predicting a looming low-income seniors housing crisis.

With Trooper, he received a White Hat from Tourism Calgary, a symbol of Western hospitality. 24th Sep, 2015 and Canadian Independent Music Association  ROAD GOLD in the summer of 2018

He is also the cousin of award-winning blues guitarist David Gogo and brother of Folk/roots musician John Gogo.

Early life
The youngest of seven children (all musicians), Gogo received formal training in music and dance during childhood. He was raised in Nanaimo by his parents Ken and Dodie Gogo, who were prominent musicians in the city. Ken Gogo is the only person to be presented with The Nanaimo Lifetime Cultural Achievement Award Posthumously and Dodie was choir director and organist with Saint Peters for 50 years 1958-2008.

Gogo's first professional gig came at age 13, when he became the youngest ever hockey organist for the Nanaimo Clippers, a Junior "A", ice hockey team.

Social and charity work  
Gogo’ is proprietor of Divine Mercy Transitional and Emergency House, providing safe affordable housing for low-income seniors.

He teaches group campfire guitar and ukulele classes (as volunteer) and has twice headlined the telethon for The Child Development Centre.

He also hosts numbers original community events as fund-raisers for STONE SOUP (which he is a director of) which is an independent charitable free-food source for up to 200 people per night.

Also, Gogo was instrumental in arranging The Saint Peters Emergency Shelter In Nanaimo and has attended his 3rd degree Knights of Columbus during his 4 terms on Parish Council.

During the Covid period of 2020/2021 he formed and recorded a new Contemporary Christian faith Group Jesus Music.

Jesus Music  
Jesus Music is a Contemporary faith music group from Nanaimo, BC, Canada. Composer Paul Roland Gogo formed the group to celebrate the Arisen Lord Jesus Christ. Jesus Music is a unique combination of funk, orchestral, pop and ancient music's. The band is partially composed of two former members from the Classic Canadian Rock Band Trooper Paul Roland Gogo (the keyboard player) and Scott Brown (the bass player). The remaining members include: Andréa L'Heureux, Jena Gogo and Jeri Gogo.

The music is being explained as a fusion of denominational styles and International genres. Jesus Music is attempting to expands upon a traction of sacred music as was taught by the Second Vatican Council of the Roman Catholic Church. The subject matter of Jesus Music is based on the idea of Jesus being ALIVE today (revelations 1:18). Jesus Music has set-out to explore this topic as well as other famous passages (James 2:14) whereby an individual must take actions to succeed in salvation. Their first EP suitably named EP NUMBER ONE clearly states that there shall be no false Gods (Exodus 20 3-5) and the remaining songs continue to exhaust praise towards God as described in The Christian Bible.

Jesus Music has found early success - Within the first month of the release of the first EP, Jesus Music has been featured and added to Christian Radio Stations in 42 Nations. Jesus Music is certified 100% Canadian Content by the Canadian Radio-television and Telecommunications Commission and mostly broadcast in African and South American Nations. One early review by "The Berean Test" have praised Jesus Music for having strong messages and lyrics that correspond well with scripture.

References

External links
 Trooper official website
 CanadianBands.com Super Groovy Band entry
 CanadianBands.com Trooper entry
 Gogo Facebook fan page
 Gogo's Road Reports

1965 births
Canadian male singers
Canadian memoirists
Canadian rock singers
Canadian songwriters
Living people
Musicians from British Columbia
People from Nanaimo